Hediste is a genus of annelids belonging to the family Nereididae.

The species of this genus are found in Europe, Japan and Northern America.

Species
Species in this genus include:
 Hediste atoka Sato & Nakashima, 2003
 Hediste diadroma Sato & Nakashima, 2003
 Hediste diversicolor (O. F. Müller, 1776)

References

Phyllodocida
Polychaete genera